The 2020 Stanford Cardinal men's soccer team represented Stanford University during the 2020 NCAA Division I men's soccer season. They were led by ninth year head coach Jeremy Gunn.

Effects of the Covid-19 Pandemic 
On August 13, 2020, the Pac-12 Conference postponed all fall sports through the end of the calendar year.

On November 4, 2020, the NCAA approved a plan for college soccer to be played in the spring.

Roster 
Source:

Schedule

Postseason

NCAA Tournament

References 

2020
2020 Pac-12 Conference men's soccer season
American men's college soccer teams 2020 season
2020 in sports in California
2020 NCAA Division I Men's Soccer Tournament participants